Hester Store is a historic general store located at Dacusville, Pickens County, South Carolina.  It was built in 1893, and is a two-story, front gable, weatherboard-clad building with an ashlar granite front facade.  It features a full-width, single story, porch with granite pillars.  The granite facade and porch were added in 1933.

It was listed on the National Register of Historic Places in 2013.

References 

Commercial buildings on the National Register of Historic Places in South Carolina
Commercial buildings completed in 1893
Buildings and structures in Pickens County, South Carolina
National Register of Historic Places in Pickens County, South Carolina